The 2015 Senior Bowl was an all-star college football exhibition game featuring players from the 2014 NCAA Division I FBS football season as well as prospects for the 2015 Draft of the professional National Football League (NFL). The game concluded the post-season that had begun on December 21, 2014. Sponsored by Reese's Peanut Butter Cups, it was officially known as the Reese's Senior Bowl.

Played at Ladd–Peebles Stadium in Mobile, Alabama, the game featured the North and the South as the opposing teams. The NFL Network broadcast the game live on January 24, 2015, at 3:00 p.m. CST. The North won 34–13.

Sports Illustrated named Ali Marpet of Hobart and William Smith Colleges—the first NCAA Division III player selected for the Senior Bowl in its 66 years—the game's "biggest riser".

Rosters

North Team

South Team

Game summary

Scoring summary

Statistics

References

Senior Bowl
Senior Bowl
Senior Bowl
Senior Bowl